Emily Orwaru (born 1988) is a Kenyan aeronautical engineer, who works as an aeronautical planning engineer, at Kenya Airways, the country's national airline.

Background and education

At the age of nine, she suffered from a bout of tonsillitis, which left her deaf in the right ear. Later, she was diagnosed with keratoconus, an  eye condition characterized by thinning of the cornea in both eyes. She has to wear rigid contact lens to correct the problem. After attending elementary and high schools in Kenya, she benefited from a scholarship by the government of Russia, to attend Samara State Aerospace University, in Samara, Russia, where she studied Aerospace engineering, graduating with a Bachelor of Engineering (BEng) degree in 2009.

Career
In 2014, Orwaru was diagnosed with metastatic breast cancer, for which she had to undergo chemotherapy and radiotherapy. In June 2014, she was hired as an aircraft maintenance technician at Kenya Airways, working in that capacity for six months until December 2014. Later, she was promoted to her present position of Aeronautical Planning Engineer.

Other achievements and activities
In October 2017, Emily Orwaru was named among the "Top 40 Under 40 Women in Kenya 2017" by Business Daily Africa, an English-language business daily newspaper, published by the Nation Media Group. She is involved in a community-based economic development group in Nyamira, her home village. She is also a member of a cancer support group called "Faraja Cancer Care".

See also
 Iddah Asin
 Naomi Rono
 Sheila Mwarangu
 Liz Aluvanze

References

External links
Website of Kenya Airways

1988 births
Kenyan engineers
Kenyan women
Kenyan women engineers
Aeronautical engineers
Kenya Airways people
Samara State Aerospace University alumni
Living people
People from Nyamira County
21st-century women engineers